Juventus Football Club won the domestic title and reached a second consecutive Champions League final, where Karl-Heinz Riedle scored twice for Borussia Dortmund in a 3–1 defeat of Juventus.

Overview

Players

Squad information
Squad at end of season

Transfers

Winter

Competitions

Serie A

League table

Results by round

Position by round

Matches

Coppa Italia

UEFA Champions League

Group stage

Knockout phase

Quarter-finals

Semi-finals

Final

Intercontinental Cup

UEFA Super Cup

Statistics

Players statistics

Goalscorers

References

Juventus F.C. seasons
Juventus
Italian football championship-winning seasons